Helena was a niece of Byzantine Empress Sophia. She is known only because of Georgios Kedrenos and the Suda. They mention a statue of her in the Milion, alongside statues of Sophia and Arabia, respectively the wife and daughter of Justin II.

References

Sources

 

Justinian dynasty
6th-century Byzantine people
6th-century Byzantine women